Stevens County is the name of several counties in the United States:

Stevens County, Kansas
Stevens County, Minnesota
Stevens County, Washington

See also
Stephens County (disambiguation)